Cereopsius arbiter is a species of beetle in the family Cerambycidae. It was described by  Medina, Mantilla, Cabras and Vitali in 2021. It is known from the Philippines.

References

Cereopsius
Beetles described in 2021